Kampō (or Kanpō, 漢方) medicine is the Japanese study and adaptation of Traditional Chinese medicine. Today in Japan, Kampo is integrated into the national health care system. In 1967, the Ministry of Health, Labour and Welfare approved 4 kampo medicines for reimbursement under the National Health Insurance (NHI) program. In 1976, 82 kampo medicines were approved by the Ministry of Health, Labour and Welfare. Currently, 148 kampo medicines are approved for reimbursement. 

Rather than modifying formulas as in Traditional Chinese medicine, the Japanese kampo tradition uses fixed combinations of herbs in standardized proportions according to the classical literature of Chinese medicine. Kampo medicines are produced by various manufacturers. However, each medicine is composed of exactly the same ingredients under the Ministry's standardization methodology. The medicines are therefore prepared under strict manufacturing conditions that rival pharmaceutical companies.

Extensive modern scientific research in Japan has validated the effectiveness of kampo medicines.  In October, 2000 a nationwide study was carried out that reported that 72% of registered physicians prescribe kampo medicines . The two leading companies making kampo medicines are Tsumura (ツムラ) and Kracie (クラシエ) the former name Kanebō (カネボウ) . 

The following list are the kampo medicines produced by Tsumura.  Many kampo medicines were borrowed from China. The Chinese name for the formula the kampo medicine is based on is listed below. However, the formula usually doesn't completely match the original Chinese formula. Often the proportions of the herbs were changed slightly.  Also some Chinese species of herbs were replaced with herbs found in Japan.

OTC kampo/quasi kampo

Over the counter Kampo (一般用医薬品 literally general use medicine) include some Kampo/quasi Kampo formulations that can be obtained without going to a Kampo speciality store and/or without a prescription from a doctor.  They can be bought from any drugstore or even convenience stores.  In Japan, there is a tendency to list all plants ingredients together as a formulation.  This contrasts with the USA, where additional (and optional) plant ingredients in a formulation are listed separately as inactive ingredients, and are not covered by a patent (only the active ingredient).  For example, some nasal sprays in USA with oxymetazoline HCL (the active ingredient) contain menthol and eucalyptol listed as inactive ingredients.  The addition of such ingredients does not constitute a novel formulation in US.

There is no rule that states Kampo must not be mixed with Western medicines in a single formulation.  Additionally, things like sustained release (徐放性製剤) have worked their way into the Kampo and TCM worlds.

List

 Takeda Pharmaceuticals Ichoyaku K (胃腸薬Ｋ) formulation, It contains a blend of the traditional Chinese Koshaheiisan (香砂平胃散) and Chinese peony root, as one of 9 other plant ingredients.  There are a few versions: powder form to be mixed with water, or for convenience tablet form, but also incorporates tablet making ingredients.
 Seirogan (正露丸)

Herbs used in kampo medicines

The 14th edition of the Japanese Pharmacopoeia (JP) (日本薬局方 Nihon yakkyokuhō) lists 165 herbal ingredients that are used in kampo medicines.  Tsumura (ツムラ) is the leading maker of kampo medicine . They make 128 of the 148 kampo medicines. The most common herb in kampo medicine is Glycyrrhizae Radix (Chinese liquorice root). It is in 94 of the 128 Tsumura formulas. Other common herbs are Zingiberis Rhizoma (ginger) (51 of 128 formulas) and Paeoniae Radix (Chinese peony root) (44 of 128 formulas).

See also
Chinese patent medicine
Chinese classic herbal formula

References

External links 

 Formula Catalog at the Keio University School of Medicine's Center for Kampo Medicine Website

Plants used in traditional Chinese medicine